Rafi Cohen  (born 28 November 1970) is a retired Israeli footballer who played for 26 years.

Biography
Cohen began his career with Hapoel Eilat in 1987. After a single season he was transferred to Hapoel Petah Tikva, where he made 139 appearances, and also appeared for the Israel national team. In 1993, he moved to Maccabi Haifa, before transferring to city rivals Hapoel in 1996. After a season at Hapoel Haifa he moved onto Bnei Yehuda and then in 1998 Maccabi Tel Aviv. In 1999, he returned to Hapoel Petah Tikva and made his last appearance for Israel in 2000. He left the club again in 2001 to join Maccabi Kiyat Gat. He moved to Maccabi Petah Tikva the following year, before returning to Hapoel Petah Tikva for a third time in 2002. In 2007, he left to join Hapoel Ramat Gan. After 3 seasons in Ramat Gan he moved in July 2010 to Hapoel Jerusalem.

Cohen played 43 times for Israel between 1992 and 2000.

Honours
Israeli Premier League
Winner (1): 1993–94
Runner-up (4): 1988–89, 1989–90, 1990–91, 1994–95
Israel State Cup
Winner (2): 1993, 1995
Runner-up (1): 1991
Toto Cup
Winner (4): 1989–90, 1990–91, 1993–94, 2004–05
Liga Alef South:
Winner (1): 2010-11

References

External links

1970 births
Israeli Jews
Living people
Israeli footballers
Association football goalkeepers
Hapoel Eilat F.C. players
Hapoel Petah Tikva F.C. players
Maccabi Haifa F.C. players
Hapoel Haifa F.C. players
Bnei Yehuda Tel Aviv F.C. players
Maccabi Tel Aviv F.C. players
Maccabi Kiryat Gat F.C. players
Maccabi Petah Tikva F.C. players
Hapoel Ramat Gan F.C. players
Israel international footballers
Liga Leumit players
Israeli Premier League players
Footballers from Eilat